Henri Pierre Armand Nnouck Minka (born July 15, 1984 in Douala) is a professional Cameroonian footballer who plays for Douala Athletic Club.

Career 
He also played previously from 2000 to 2004 with Jeunesse de Bonamoussadi and from 2004 until 2010 with Cotonsport Garoua.

International 
Minka was 2004 first time nominated for the Cameroon national football team and played until 2009 in five national games. He played also for the Cameroonian national army football team and won 2007 the African Military Cup.

References

1984 births
Living people
Cameroonian footballers
Douala Athletic Club players
Coton Sport FC de Garoua players
Association football defenders